Eight Ash Green is a village and civil parish on the A1124 road, near Junction 26 (Eight Ash Green Interchange) of the A12 road, in the Colchester district, in the county of Essex, England. The population of the civil parish at the 2011 census was 1,730. The parish was formed on 1 April 1949 from Copford, Fordham, Stanway, and Aldham.

References 

 Essex A-Z (page 164)

Villages in Essex
Civil parishes in Essex
Borough of Colchester